Neeru Bajwa (born 26 August 1980) is a Canadian actress, director and producer who has mainly worked in Punjabi and Hindi films. She started her career in 1998 with Dev Anand's Bollywood film Main Solah Baras Ki and then moved on to working in Hindi soap operas and Punjabi-language films.

Career 
Bajwa started her career in Indian soap operas in 2005 with Hari Mirchi Lal Mirchi on DD1 before moving on to Astitva...Ek Prem Kahani on Zee TV followed by Jeet on Star Plus and then Guns and Roses on STAR One.

In January 2013, Bajwa appeared in the multi-starer Punjabi film Saadi Love Story, produced by Jimmy Sheirgill productions, directed by Dheeraj Rattan and starring Diljit Dosanjh, Amrinder Gill, and Surveen Chawla. She paired up opposite Diljit Dosanjh again in the film Jatt and Juliet 2 which broke all the previous opening day collection records for Punjabi cinema. In August 2013, her film, Naughty Jatts was released in which she featured along with Binnu Dhillon, Arya Babbar and Roshan Prince. The film got mixed reviews from critics.

Bajwa debuted as a director in 2017 with the Punjabi film Sargi, which stars her sister Rubina Bajwa in the leading role alongside Jassi Gill and Babbal Rai. She also owns a production company called Neeru Bajwa Entertainment. In November 2019, Bajwa starrer and produced film Beautiful Billo went on floors, in which she will be sharing the screen with her sister Rubina Bajwa. Since April 2021, Bajwa is hosting a Punjabi show Jazba.

Personal life 
Born to Jaswant Bajwa and Surinder Bajwa in Surrey, British Columbia, Canada, Bajwa has two sistersRubina, an actress; Sabrina, a cloth designer and a brother Suhail. In her documentary film Bollywood Bound, Bajwa admits to being a high school drop out who had little interest in studies and was always inspired by the glamour of Bollywood, so she moved to Mumbai to fulfill her dreams.

Bajwa married Harry Jawandha on 8 February 2015. The couple had their first child, a girl, in August 2015. In 2020, Bajwa gave birth to twins, both girls.

Filmography

As actor

As director

Music videos

Television

Awards and nominations

References

External links 

 
 

1980 births
Living people
Actresses from British Columbia
Actresses in Hindi cinema
Actresses in Hindi television
Actresses in Punjabi cinema
Canadian actresses of Indian descent
Canadian expatriate actresses in India
Canadian film actresses
Canadian people of Indian descent
Canadian people of Punjabi descent
Canadian Sikhs
Canadian television actresses
People from Surrey, British Columbia
20th-century Canadian actresses
21st-century Canadian actresses